The 2015 season was Helsingin Jalkapalloklubi's 107th competitive season. HJK is the most successful football club in Finland with 27 Finnish Championships, 12 Finnish Cup titles, 5 Finnish League Cup titles, one appearance in the UEFA Champions League group stages and one appearance in the UEFA Europa League group stages.

As Veikkausliiga 2014 champions, HJK entered the 2015–16 UEFA Champions League second qualifying round.

The Under-19 team, including several players from Klubi-04 participated in the 2015–16 UEFA Youth League.

Squad
As of September 1, 2015. Source: 

 Dual registered with feeder team Klubi-04.

On loan

Transfers

Winter

In:

Out:

Summer

In:

  
 
 

 

Out:

Competitions

Veikkausliiga

The 2015 Veikkausliiga season begins on April 12, 2015 and ends on October 25th 2015. Veikkausliiga takes place in the spring to autumn season, due to harsh winter weather conditions in Finland.

League table

Results summary

Results by matchday

Results

Finnish Cup

League Cup

UEFA Champions League

UEFA Europa League

Squad statistics

Appearances and goals

|-
|colspan="14"|Players from Klubi-04 who appeared:

|-
|colspan="14"|Players who left HJK during the season:

|}

Goal scorers

Disciplinary record

References

2015
Hjk